Events from the year 1587 in the Kingdom of Scotland.

Incumbents
Monarch – James VI

Events
 8 February – the captive Mary, Queen of Scots, is beheaded at Fotheringhay Castle in England on the orders of her cousin Elizabeth I of England for being implicated in plots against her.

Births
Approximate date – Thomas Young, Presbyterian minister (died 1655 in England)

Deaths
 8 February – Mary, Queen of Scots (born 1542)
John Black, composer (born c.1520)

See also
 Timeline of Scottish history

References

 
Years of the 16th century in Scotland